Nauhatta is a village and corresponding community development block in Rohtas district of Bihar, India. As of 2011, the village of Nauhatta had a population of 5,103, in 909 households, while Nauhatta block had a population of 94,065, in 16,387 households. The nearest city is Dehri.

Geography 
Parts of Nauhatta block are located on the Rohtas plateau. There is no irrigation system in place in Nauhatta block; many parts of the block are hilly and unsuitable for irrigation. The area of Nauhatta block is 39,494 hectares, including 10,402.4 hectares of forest, while the area of Nauhatta village is 497 hectares.

Demographics 

Nauhatta is an entirely rural subdistrict, with no major urban centres. The block's sex ratio was 916 in 2011. The sex ratio was higher in the 0–6 age group, where it was 936. Members of scheduled castes made up 19.47% of the block population and members of scheduled tribes made up 11.88% (the latter percentage was the highest in Rohtas). The literacy rate of Nauhatta block was 63.07%, lowest in Rohtas, with a 23.02% literacy gap between men (74.05%) and women (51.03%).

Of the village of Nauhatta's 5,103 residents in 2011, 2,581 (50.58%) were male and 2,522 (49.42%) were female. 13.78% of the population was in the 0–6 age group. The literacy rate was 62.32% (69.20% among men and 55.27% among women).

Employment 
The village of Nauhatta had 1,752 total workers in 2011, of whom 1,207 (68.89%) were male and 545 (31.11%) were female. There were a total of 386 cultivators (321 male and 65 female) who owned or leased their own land, 946 agricultural labourers (555 male and 391 female) who worked someone else's land for wages, 87 household industry workers (60 male and 27 female), and 333 other workers (271 male and 62 female).

Amenities 
In 2011, 19.08% of Nauhatta block households lived in permanent pucca houses, 58.74% lived in semi-permanent houses, and 21.99% lived in temporary kutcha houses. 3.19% of households primarily used tap water as a source of drinking water, 16.17% primarily used wells, and 78.92% primarily used hand pumps. In terms of lighting, 20.91% of households had electric lights and 77.9% used kerosene lamps. 5.79% of households had flush toilets, with 0.8% being connected to sewers and 4.51% to septic tanks; a large majority of block residents had no toilet at home, with 93.31% using open defecation. In terms of cooking, most households (79.55%) used firewood as fuel, with 13.38% using cow dung and 5.72% using crop residue. Most households (74.81%) did not have a kitchen at home; 20.41% did have kitchens. 58.53% of households had access to banking services.

20% of households owned radios in 2011, 12.91% had televisions, 0.5% had a computers with internet access and 7.07% had computers without internet, 1.67% had landline telephones and 55.31% had cell phones (1.52% had both), 43.01% had bicycles, 5.15% had motor scooters, motorcycles, or mopeds, and 1.36% had automobiles. 27.76% had none of the above items.

Villages 
Nauhatta is one of 68 villages in Nauhatta block. Of these, 65 are inhabited and 3 are uninhabited.

The village of Chunda is the largest village in Rohtas district in terms of physical area.

References 

Villages in Rohtas district